The 1944–45 Holy Cross Crusaders men's basketball team represented The College of the Holy Cross during the 1944–45 NCAA men's basketball season. The head coach was Albert Riopel, coaching the crusaders in his third season. The team finished with an overall record of 4–9.

Schedule

|-

References

Holy Cross Crusaders men's basketball seasons
Holy Cross